Marvin "Mickey" Rottner (March 23, 1919 – September 21, 2011) was an American professional basketball player. He played three seasons of professional basketball in the years leading up to the formation of the National Basketball Association.

Rottner, a 5'10" guard from Tuley High School in Chicago, played collegiately at Loyola University in Chicago.  He played for the Ramblers from 1939 to 1942 and was later named to the school's athletics hall of fame.

Following his college career, Rottner played professionally, first in the National Basketball League (NBL) for the Sheboygan Red Skins in 1945–46.  He averaged four points per game for the Red Skins as they made it all the way to the NBL finals, where they lost to the Rochester Royals.  Rottner then moved to the Basketball Association of America (BAA) to play for the Chicago Stags for two seasons.  He averaged 5.4 points and 1.4 assists for the Stags in 100 games.

Rottner died September 21, 2011.

BAA career statistics

Regular season

Playoffs

References

1919 births
2011 deaths
American men's basketball players
Basketball players from Chicago
Chicago Stags players
Guards (basketball)
Jewish men's basketball players
Loyola Ramblers men's basketball players
Sheboygan Red Skins players